Guettardite is a rare arsenic-antimony lead sulfosalt mineral with the chemical formula . It forms gray black metallic prismatic to acicular crystals with monoclinic symmetry. It is a dimorph of the triclinic twinnite.

Discovery and occurrence
It was first described in 1967 for an occurrence in the Taylor Pit, Madoc, Hastings County, Ontario, Canada. It was named for French naturalist Jean-Étienne Guettard (1715–1786).

It occurs in hydrothermal veins within marble at the type locality in Modoc. It occurs associated with pyrite, sphalerite, wurtzite, galena, stibnite, orpiment, realgar, enargite, tetrahedrite, zinkenite, jordanite, bournonite, sterryite, boulangerite, jamesonite and sartorite at Madoc.

In addition to the type locality, it has been reported from the Brobdingnag mine, near Silverton, Colorado; the Jas Roux deposit in 
Hautes-Alpes, France; from various marble quarries near Seravezza, Tuscany, Italy; a marble quarry in Valais, Switzerland and from Khaydarkan, Fergana Valley, Alai Mountains, Kyrgyzstan.

See also
 List of minerals named after people

References

External links
 Discovery of guettardite in French

Sulfosalt minerals
Lead minerals
Monoclinic minerals
Minerals in space group 14